Giggenbach Ridge is a north-south chain of summits, 5 nautical miles (9 km) long, located to the west and northwest of Mount Terror on Ross Island.  The ridge rises to c.2400 m west of Mount Terror, but descends to 1320 m at the north end.

Namesake
At the suggestion of P.R. Kyle, named by Advisory Committee on Antarctic Names (US-ACAN) (2000) after Werner F. Giggenbach (d.), Chemistry Division, DSIR, who worked in the NZAP at Mount Erebus in four field seasons during the 1970s.  He rappelled into the Inner Crater of Mount Erebus in 1978, but had to be pulled out when an eruption showered him and colleagues on the crater rim with volcanic bombs; one of the leading volcanic gas geochemists of the period.

References

Ridges of Ross Island